Salman Bahrani is an Iranian football forward who currently plays for Iranian football club Mes Rafsanjan in the Azadegan League.

References

1989 births
Living people
People from Bushehr
Iranian footballers
Association football forwards
Shahin Bushehr F.C. players
Khooshe Talaei players
21st-century Iranian people